This is a list of television, radio and print media operations in Shreveport, Louisiana.

Television

Notes:
 KPXJ was the first station in the U.S. to convert its broadcast signal to digital-only in September 2005..
 In 2004, KPXJ became a UPN affiliate. It was originally an affiliate of PAX (now known as Ion). Shreveport is now one of a few markets which the Ion network does not have an affiliate station. Ion's national feed can be seen on Cox Communications in Bossier City and on Comcast in Shreveport.
Previously, UPN was broadcast on KSHV, sharing an affiliation with The WB network. UPN programming aired from 9 to 11 p.m. Syndicated programming currently airs at that time on channel 45.
KTBS broadcasts newscasts for KPXJ on Monday through Friday mornings at 7 a.m. and nightly at 9 p.m. Before becoming a UPN affiliate in 2004, KPXJ aired rebroadcasts of KTBS 3 News daily at 5:30 p.m. (rebroadcast of the 5 p.m. newscast) and 11 p.m. (rebroadcast of the 10 p.m. newscast).

Radio
AM stations

FM stations

Newspapers

The major daily newspaper serving the Shreveport-Bossier and Ark-La-Tex area is The Shreveport Times. Its headquarters are located in downtown Shreveport. 

Other smaller non-daily newspapers

Caddo Citizen
Daily Legal News
The Shreveport Sun 
The Inquisitor

Bossier City is served by the daily Bossier Press-Tribune. 

The Bombardier is the weekly newspaper of record for the Barksdale Air Force Base. 

Alternative publications

The Best of Times
The Christian Times
City Lights
SB Magazine

Specialty publications

American Classifieds / Thrifty Nickel
LA Health
LA Parenting
Make & Model
Move On In
Real Estate Book

See also
 Louisiana media
 List of newspapers in Louisiana
 List of radio stations in Louisiana
 List of television stations in Louisiana
 Media of locales in Louisiana: Baton Rouge, Lafayette, Monroe, New Orleans, Terrebonne Parish

Shreveport
Mass media in Shreveport, Louisiana